OXN may refer to:

 Oxenholme Lake District railway station, England; National Rail station code OXN
 Oxnard (Amtrak station), California, United States; Amtrak station code OXN
 Oxonica, a British nanotechnology company; EPIC code OXN